Ahmed Madbouly    is an Egyptian footballer who plays for Egyptian Premier League side Ismaily as a winger.

Honours
Zamalek SC

 Egypt Cup: 2017–18
 Saudi-Egyptian Super Cup: 2018
 CAF Confederation Cup : 2018–19

References

External links
 

Living people
Egyptian footballers
1994 births
Association football midfielders
People from Asyut Governorate
Egyptian Premier League players
Al Nasr Lel Taa'den SC players
Zamalek SC players